The Elmore Family School of Electrical and Computer Engineering (ECE) is the largest academic unit at Purdue University College of Engineering. The School of ECE offers both undergraduate B.S. degree as well as M.S. and Ph.D. graduate degrees in Electrical Engineering and Computer Engineering. The school enrolls over 1,900 undergraduates (sophomores through seniors) and over 1,300 graduate students. U.S. News & World Report ranks Purdue's Electrical Engineering 9th and Computer Engineering 10th at the Undergraduate level [America's Best Colleges 2023]. The Graduate programs in both Computer Engineering and Electrical Engineering are ranked 9th [America's Best Graduate Schools 2023]
The online MS program in Electrical Engineering is ranked #1 in the nation (U.S. News & World Report, 2023).

History
The School of Electrical and Computer Engineering (ECE) was established in 1888 with Louis Bell, Professor of Applied Electricity, as the head. At this time the first Electrical Engineering building was located opposite of Stanley Coulter Hall on the site of the present-day Wetherill Laboratory of Chemistry. Railroad tracks came alongside the building to provide a berth for the Purdue University Interurban Test Car.

In 1901, Telephone Engineering became part of ECE to accommodate the urgent need for engineers who understood how to expand telephone systems from city to city.

WBAA, Indiana's first radio station, was started in Purdue ECE in 1922.

In 1924, a new Electrical Engineering building was constructed to celebrate Purdue's 50th birthday. Additions to the building were added in 1932 and 1940 made possible by Thomas Duncan, a Scottish immigrant who owned the nearby, highly successful Duncan Electric Company.

Purdue ECE played an important role in the early TV technology with Professor Roscoe George's many inventions including the first all-electronic television receiver.

The Lab for Applied Industrial Control was created in 1966.

The Materials and Electrical Engineering Building was built in 1988.

In 1996, the School of Electrical Engineering is officially renamed the School of Electrical and Computer Engineering.

In August 2021, the school was renamed as the Elmore Family School of Electrical and Computer Engineering, as a recognition of a $25M gift by venture capitalist Bill Elmore (BSEE75, MSEE76).

School Heads 

Only non-interim heads are listed below.
 Dimitrios Peroulis, 2019- 
 Ragu Balakrishnan, 2010-2018
 Mark J. T. Smith, 2003-2009
 Kent Fuchs, 1996-2002
 Richard Schwartz, 1985-1995
 Bernd Hoefflinger, 1984-1985
 Clarence Coates, 1972-1983
 John Hancock, 1965-1972
 William Hayt, 1962-1965
 Thomas Jones, 1958-1962
 Paul Chenea, 1957-1958
 J. Stuart Johnson, 1954-1957
 Dressel Ewing, 1942-1954
 Charles Francis Harding, 1908-1942
 Charles Matthews, 1904-1907
 Winder Goldsborough, 1896-1904
 Harold Smith, 1893-1896
 Reginald Fessenden, 1892-1893
 Albert Carman, 1889-1892
 Louis Bell, 1888-1889

Student organizations

 Eta Kappa Nu, Beta Chapter (ΗΚΝ) - International Honor Society for Electrical Engineers
 IEEE - Student Chapter
 Purdue Student Engineering Foundation (PSEF)
 National Society of Black Engineers (NSBE)
 Society of Mexican American Engineers and Scientists (MAES)
 Society of Hispanic Professional Engineers (SHPE)
 Society of Women Engineers (SWE)
 Tau Beta Pi - National Engineering Honor Society
 Purdue Engineering Student Council (PESC)
 ECE Student Society (ECESS)

Notable alumni 

 Fernley H. Banbury, inventor
 Rashid Bashir, dean of the University of Illinois at Urbana-Champaign Grainger College of Engineering
 Arthur J. Bond, dean of engineering at Alabama A&M, co-founder of NSBE
 Michael Birck, founder, former CEO, and chairman of Tellabs
 Eugene Cernan, NASA astronaut who walked on the moon
 Clarence Cory, father of Electrical Engineering at UC Berkeley
 John Costas, inventor
 David Crosthwait, inventor who redefined the technology of indoor climate control
 Reginald Fessenden, former head, arranged first radio broadcast
 George H. Goble, 1996 Ig Nobel Prize winner
 Lila Ibrahim, COO at DeepMind
 Marwan Muasher, Jordanian ambassador to the U.S.
 Edward Purcell, Nobel Laureate for Nuclear Magnetism (MRI)
 George Mueller, director of NASA Apollo Moon landing project, father of Space Shuttle
 Valerie Taylor, computer scientist
 Don Thompson, Former President and CEO of McDonald's
 Blake Ragsdale Van Leer, 5th President of Georgia Institute of Technology
 Theodore Rappaport, a pioneer in wireless communication technology
 William L. Wearly, CEO of Ingersoll-Rand
 David Wolf, NASA astronaut

Notable faculty 
 Jan Allebach
 Alexandra Boltasseva
 Carla Brodley, 1994-2004
 Mung Chiang
 Leon O. Chua, 1964-1970
 Clarence Coates, 1973-1988
 Supriyo Datta
 Reginald Fessenden, invented radio telephony
 King-Sun Fu, 1960-1985
 Kent Fuchs, 1996-2002
 Keinosuke Fukunaga
 Thomas Huang, 1973-1980
 Linda Katehi, 2002-2006
 Gerhard Klimeck
 Leah Jamieson
 Mark Lundstrom
 Dimitrios Peroulis
 Vladimir Shalaev
 Mark Smith, 2003-2017
 Andrew M. Weiner
 Jerry Woodall, 2005-2012
 Peide Ye

References

External links
 Purdue School of Electrical and Computer Engineering
 Purdue University

Educational institutions established in 1888
Engineering schools and colleges in the United States
Engineering universities and colleges in Indiana
1888 establishments in Indiana